Aggiungi un posto a tavola (ET: Set another place at the table) is a musical comedy written by Pietro Garinei, Sandro Giovannini and Iaia Fiastri, with music by Armando Trovaioli. It debuted in 1974 under the direction of Garinei and Giovannini.

An English version called Beyond the Rainbow, adapted by David Forrest with lyrics by Leslie Bricusse, opened in November 1978 at the Adelphi Theatre in London's West End and ran for six months.

Background
Between 1973 and 1974, Sandro Giovannini and Pietro Garinei wrote with Iaia Fiastri a musical inspired by the novel After Me, the Deluge by David Forrest (the pseudonym of David Eliades and Robert Forrest-Webb). The total cost of the staging was about 250 million lire, due to the completion of the scenery in wood. The show received its title after a vote of the company, who preferred Aggiungi un Posto a Tavola (Add a seat at the table) to the alternatives.

Actors who played in the first edition include Johnny Dorelli (Don Silvestro), Paolo Panelli (the mayor) and Bice Valori (Consolazione).

Characters
Don Silvestro, priest
Clementina
San Crispino/Crispín, the Mayor
Totó, the dummy
Consolazione/Consuelo/Consolation, prostitute
God
Ensemble

Plot
The play is divided in two acts.

In the first act Don Silvestre receives a phone call from God announcing a second universal flood. He orders Don Silvestre to build an ark like Noah's and save the people of the village. When Don Silvestre announces this to the villagers and tells them God's will, the village Mayor, Crispíno, doesn't believe a word. The Mayor has a daughter named Clementina, who is secretly in love with the priest. After some little time God enables Don Silvestre to perform a miracle in order to convince everyone in town about the second universal flood and God's will. Good-time girl Consolazione arrives at the village — and with this things get complicated. Consolazione distracts every male in the village, thereby avoiding God's planned procreation one night before the flood, so God boosts the manhood of the village idiot, Toto, in order to distract Consolazione.

When Toto announces he has fallen in love with Consolazione and wants to marry her and take her with him on the ark when it sails, the village women get angry and stop their men from working on the vessel.  Don Silvestre intervenes and convinces the villagers to complete the ark. When it is finished and ready to sail several things happen that make the situation complicated. First the Vatican intervenes by sending a Cardinal to the village to try to lure the villagers away from Silvestro's control and the ark by treating them to a lavish meal. The first act finishes when people discover that the Mayor has gone missing.

In the second act the Mayor, who has hidden himself in a statue, emerges to make a call to the authorities in order to stop Don Silvestre in his "insane idea".  The Mayor remains hidden until the wedding between Consolazione and Toto, but is discovered, captured and imprisoned. Clementina confesses to being in love with the priest who admits his own feelings for her.

The ark is ready and Silvestre and Clementina are the only persons on board. The villagers are crowded below, unable to board because the boarding stairs had been taken away.  Heavy rain starts falling and the flood quickly starts. God orders Silvestre to sail off with Clementina, but Silvestre refuses to leave all his people. In the darkness, God's orders get louder and louder over the thunder and lightning. But Silvestre still refuses to sail off.  Instead, he decides to climb down a rope from the ark and join his villagers in death in the waters below.  Because of Silvestre's willingness to sacrifice himself for his villagers, God relents and stops the flood and the impending end of all mankind. The sun comes out again. The final scene is of everyone celebrating with a big dinner that the flood is over. A brilliant rainbow hangs over them. God glides down a shaft of light from Heaven and celebrates with them.

Musical numbers

Act I 
 Aggiungi un posto a tavola
 Peccato che sia peccato
 Sono calmo
 Concerto per prete e campane
 Buttalo via
 Notte da non dormire
 Consolazione
 Notte da non dormire (reprise)
 L'amore secondo me
 Una formica è solo una formica

Act II 
 La ballata di San Crispino
 Peccato che sia peccato (reprise)
 Clementina
 Ti voglio
 Quando l'arca si fermerà
 L'amore secondo me (reprise)
 Aggiungi un posto a tavola (finale)

Productions

Mexico
Known as "El Diluvio que Viene" (The Coming Deluge), it premiered in 1977 and lasted until 1981, with over 1,800 performances. Manolo Fabregas, made this play very famous.

For the modern version, Jaime Camil starred as the priest, María Filippini as Consuelo, Maria Ines Guerra in the role of Clementina and the mayor, Patrick Castillo, who played the same role in the original version. The theater of San Rafael was the stage of this play. Later Camil was replaced by Ernesto D'alessio. The Association of Theatre Critics and Journalists XXV recognized in awards to María Inés Guerra as Best Actress in a musical for her role as "Clementina" because of her outstanding performance, and also for her high growth as a singer, in addition to obtaining a "Bravo Award" in the same category. The flood is coming also won the "Lady of Victory" in the categories of Foreign Musical, Best Ensemble Dancers and Musical Coactor (Patricio Castillo), Newcomer (Enrique de la Riva), Coactriz (Mary Filippini), Actor in a Musical (Jaime Camil) awards to the best of theater in 2007. The Coming Deluge ended with great success after eight months on the scene and meet with 2,639 performances, as well as recording an album completely live.

References 

1974 musicals
Musicals based on novels
Italian musicals